Quantum of the Seas is a  currently operated by Royal Caribbean International and is the lead ship of her class. At her time of delivery in 2014, Quantum of the Seas was the third largest cruise ship in the world by gross tonnage. She is currently deployed to serve the Alaskan and Australian cruise markets.

History

Planning and construction 
On 11 February 2011, Royal Caribbean announced that it had ordered the first of a new class of ships from the Meyer Werft shipyard in Papenburg, Germany, scheduled to be delivered by Fall 2014. At the time, the project was code-named "Project Sunshine". Later that year, two 20.5-megawatt ABB Azipod XO propulsion units were ordered for the ship.

Meyer Werft performed the steel cutting for the ship on 31 January 2013, the same day it was announced that the new ship would be named Quantum of the Seas, making her the lead vessel of the Quantum class.

Quantum of the Seas had her keel laid down on 2 August 2013. She was floated out from the shipyard on 9 August 2014. Her River Ems conveyance began on 21 September 2014 and her sea trials began three days later, on 24 September.

Delivery and christening 
Quantum of the Seas was delivered to Royal Caribbean on 28 October 2014, at a cost of US$935 million. The ship was christened by Kristin Chenoweth on 14 November 2014 at Cape Liberty Cruise Port in Bayonne, New Jersey.

Service history
Quantum of the Seas spent her inaugural 2014–2015 season sailing from Cape Liberty on 7-to-12-night itineraries to the Caribbean and Bahamas before she was re-deployed to China. She embarked on her 53-day eastward re-positioning cruise from Cape Liberty to Shanghai in May 2015. In June 2015, the ship commenced operating cruises from Shanghai on 3-to-8-night itineraries to Japan and South Korea year-round until moving to Tianjin upon the arrival of Spectrum of the Seas in Shanghai in mid-2019. Beginning in November 2019, Quantum of the Seas was scheduled to operate seasonally in Southeast Asia from Singapore for six months each year until 2024 and rotate between homeporting in Tianjin and Singapore year-round. However, in March 2020, Royal Caribbean announced a re-deployment of Quantum of the Seas to Alaska for summer 2021, sailing week-long itineraries from Seattle, marking her debut in the Western United States.

In 2020, due to the worldwide COVID-19 pandemic, sailings were suspended, on various dates in the various regions, by all cruise lines. As of 12 January 2021, a report indicated that all Royal Caribbean sailings had been suspended until 30 April, except for Quantum of the Seas. This vessel had resumed sailing in Singapore in December 2020, "with the local government's CruiseSafe Certification ... [that meets] the comprehensive health and safety requirements developed by the Singapore government".

During the 2022 Christmas cruise the ship skipped one of its ports of call to get a passenger to medical treatment as soon as possible.

Through 2022, 2023 & 2024 the Quantum alternates between Alaska (based in Seattle) and Australia (based in Brisbane). Australian cruises include South Pacific, New Zealand and North Queensland itineraries with some shorter cruises between Brisbane and Sydney.

References

External links

 Official website

Ships of Royal Caribbean International
2014 ships
Cruise ships involved in the COVID-19 pandemic
Ships built in Papenburg